Statistics of the Scottish Football League in season 1914–15.

Scottish League Division One

Scottish League Division Two

See also
1914–15 in Scottish football

References

 
1914-15